N'Guessan-Brindoukro is a village in the far east of Ivory Coast. It is in the sub-prefecture of Tienkoikro, Koun-Fao Department, Gontougo Region, Zanzan District. The village is five kilometres west and four kilometres north of the border with Ghana.

N'Guessan-Brindoukro was a commune until March 2012, when it became one of 1126 communes nationwide that were abolished.

Notes

Former communes of Ivory Coast
Populated places in Zanzan District
Populated places in Gontougo